The Lunain is a  long river in the Yonne and Seine-et-Marne departments in north-central France. It is a right tributary of the Loing.

It joins the Loing at Épisy in Seine-et-Marne.

Départements and communes it runs through 
Yonne: Égriselles-le-Bocage, Courtoin, La Belliole, Montacher-Villegardin, Chéroy
Seine-et-Marne: Vaux-sur-Lunain, Lorrez-le-Bocage-Préaux, Paley, Nanteau-sur-Lunain, Treuzy-Levelay, Nonville, La Genevraye, Villemer, Épisy

References

Rivers of France
Rivers of Bourgogne-Franche-Comté
Rivers of Île-de-France
Rivers of Yonne
Rivers of Seine-et-Marne